Kurotani Tomoka (黒谷友香; born 11 December 1975 in Sakai, Osaka, Japan) is a Japanese actress. She starred as the femme fatale female ninja Kagero in Shinobi Heart Under Blade.

Partial filmography

Films
Boxer Joe (1995)
勝手にしやがれ!! 英雄計画  (1996)
Innocent Hearts (渇きの街) (1997)
Labyrinth of Dreams (ユメノ銀河) (1997)
Samurai Resurrection (魔界転生) (2003)
The Battling Angel (天使の牙) (2003)
Quill (クイール) (2004)
Shinobi (2005)
Ask This of Rikyu (2013), Hosokawa Gracia
Daughters (2020)
 Inori (2021)

Television
 Eternal Child (Yomiuri TV, 2000)
 Doremisora (TBS, 2002)
 Carnation (NHK, 2011)
 Midnight Diner (MBS, 2011)
 Erased (Netflix, 2017)

References

External links
Official site

1975 births
Living people
Japanese film actresses
People from Sakai, Osaka